Alexis Jandard (born 23 April 1997) is a French diver. He represented France at the World Aquatics Championships in 2015 and in 2019. He represented France at the 2020 Summer Olympics in Tokyo, Japan in the men's 3 metre springboard event.

In 2015, he won the bronze medal in the men's 10 metre platform event at the European Games in Baku, Azerbaijan.

References

External links
 

Living people
1997 births
French male divers
Divers at the 2014 Summer Youth Olympics
European Games competitors for France
Divers at the 2015 European Games
European Games medalists in diving
European Games bronze medalists for France
Olympic divers of France
Divers at the 2020 Summer Olympics
World Aquatics Championships medalists in diving
21st-century French people